

589001–589100 

|-bgcolor=#f2f2f2
| colspan=4 align=center | 
|}

589101–589200 

|-bgcolor=#f2f2f2
| colspan=4 align=center | 
|}

589201–589300 

|-bgcolor=#f2f2f2
| colspan=4 align=center | 
|}

589301–589400 

|-bgcolor=#f2f2f2
| colspan=4 align=center | 
|}

589401–589500 

|-bgcolor=#f2f2f2
| colspan=4 align=center | 
|}

589501–589600 

|-bgcolor=#f2f2f2
| colspan=4 align=center | 
|}

589601–589700 

|-bgcolor=#f2f2f2
| colspan=4 align=center | 
|}

589701–589800 

|-bgcolor=#f2f2f2
| colspan=4 align=center | 
|}

589801–589900 

|-bgcolor=#f2f2f2
| colspan=4 align=center | 
|}

589901–590000 

|-id=944
| 589944 Suhua ||  || Hua Su (born 1972), a Chinese amateur astronomer from Yiyang, Hunan, who has found more than 200 SOHO comets. || 
|}

References 

589001-590000